Matthew "Matt" Mercieca (born 19 July 1990), generally known by his stage name as Muxu, is a Maltese singer and song writer from Msida, Malta. Having multiple number one singles, and winning local awards, Muxu is one of Malta's leading R&B artists.

Career
Mercieca started his career, as a song writer co writing with Maltese producer Jay Omaro. In 2008, he released his first single "Beat My Drum" which made it to the number one spot on the Maltese charts. It led him to being nominated "Best Newcomer" at the 2008 Bay Music Awards. In 2009, he was signed to the UK label play records but was dropped after a year citing 'artistic differences'. "Still Missing You" featuring Local singer and known DJ Talitha was released in late October 2009 and brought Mercieca back to the stage in Malta.

Junior Eurovision 
In November 2014 Muxu wote the lyrics for the song Diamonds for Frederica Falzon and the song finished in fourth place. In November 2015 Maltese singer Destiny Chukunyere performed a song with lyrics written by her and Muxu named Not My Soul. The song was placed first, giving Malta the second Junior Eurovision win in three years.

References

1990 births
Living people
Maltese singer-songwriters